The Prince of the Impossible (Italian:Il principe dell'impossible) is a 1918 Italian film directed by Augusto Genina.

Cast
Alfonso Cassini   
Helena Makowska   
Ruggero Ruggeri  
Ernesto Sabbatini

References

Bibliography
 Moliterno, Gino. The A to Z of Italian Cinema. Scarecrow Press, 2009.

External links

1918 films
Italian silent feature films
Films directed by Augusto Genina
Italian black-and-white films